Cloutier is a French occupational name for a nailer, i.e. someone who made and sold nails, from an agent derivative of clou (Latin clavus) for "nail". Notable people with the name include:

Alexandre Cloutier (born 1977), Canadian politician
Catherine Cloutier (born 1950), American politician
Claude Cloutier (born 1957), Quebec film animator and graphic novel artist
Dan Cloutier (born 1976), Canadian ice hockey player
François-Xavier Cloutier (1848–1934), Bishop of Trois Rivières
Gilles Cloutier (1928–2014), Canadian scientist
Gary Cloutier (born 1962), American politician
Guy Cloutier (born 1940), Canadian producer, convicted sex offender
Guylaine Cloutier (born 1969), Canadian international swimmer 
Jacques Cloutier (born 1960), Canadian ice hockey player
Kim Cloutier (born 1987), Canadian model
Patrick Cloutier (born 1970), Canadian soldier who became famous during the 1990 Oka Crisis
Philip D. Cloutier (1949–1998), American politician
Réal Cloutier (born 1956), Canadian ice hockey player
T. J. Cloutier (born 1939), American professional poker player
Sheila Watt-Cloutier (born 1953), Canadian Inuit activist
Suzanne Cloutier (1927–2003), Canadian film actress
Véronique Cloutier (born 1974), French Canadian TV and radio personality
Zacharie Cloutier (c.1590–1677), one of the founders of Beauport, Quebec

See also 
Saint-Alphonse/Lac Cloutier Water Aerodrome, Quebec, Canada

French-language surnames